Statistics Mauritius formerly known as the Central Statistics Office (CSO) is the national statistical agency of Mauritius. It operates under the aegis of the Ministry of Finance and Economic Development and is responsible for all statistical activities except for fisheries and health statistics which fall under the responsibility of the respective ministry. 

According to the Statistics Act No. 38 of 2000, "Statistics Mauritius shall constitute the central statistical authority and depository of all officials statistics produced in Mauritius and as such, shall collect, compile, analyse and disseminate accurate, relevant, timely and high quality statistics and related information on social, demographic, economic and financial activities to serve the needs of public and private users." The headquarters of the statistics office is located in Port Louis.

See also
 List of national and international statistical services

References

External links

Government agencies of Mauritius
Government agencies established in 1945
Mauritius